Qadamgah-e Emam Reza may refer to:
 Qadamgah-e Emam Reza, Hormozgan
 Qadamgah-e Emam Reza, Khuzestan